Kate Kennedy (born 24 September 1977) is a British biographer, academic and BBC broadcaster, who specialises in the literature and music of the First World War. She is the Associate Director of the Oxford Centre for Life-writing at the University of Oxford.

Early life and education
Born in Bristol, Kennedy attended the specialist music school, Wells Cathedral School, where she studied as a cellist. In 1996 she commenced studying Music and then English at St Catharine's College, Cambridge. Despite a severe arm injury which affected her career as a cellist, in 2000 she was awarded a scholarship to the Royal College of Music where she studied for a PgDip in advanced performance. She then completed a master's degree in twentieth century literature at King’s College, London, and freelanced as a baroque cellist in London, helping to found the orchestra Southbank Sinfonia with its founder-conductor Simon Over before returning to Cambridge in 2005 where she completed a PhD at Clare Hall on the First World War poet and composer Ivor Gurney.

Career
Kennedy has lectured in music and English at Girton College, Cambridge, where she received a Katherine Jex-Blake Research Fellowship as well as a Leverhulme Early Career Research Fellowship. In 2016 she became a member of the English Faculty at Oxford University, where she is Associate Director of the Oxford Centre for Life-writing at Wolfson College (founded by Professor Dame Hermione Lee in 2011), and holds a Research Fellowship in Life-Writing.

Selected bibliography
 Ivor Gurney: Poet, Composer (Ivor Gurney Society Journal Special Issue, 2007)
 The First World War: Literature, Music, Memory (Routledge, 2011)
 The Silent Morning: Culture, Memory and the Armistice 1918 (Manchester UP, 2013), co-editor with Trudi Tate 
 Literary Britten (Boydell and Brewer, 2018) 
 The Fateful Voyage (play script, 2018), starring Alex Jennings
 Lives of Houses (Princeton University Press, 2020), co-editor with Hermione Lee)
 Dweller in Shadows: A Life of Ivor Gurney (Princeton UP, 2021)

References

External links
Personal website

1977 births
Living people
Alumni of St Catharine's College, Cambridge
Alumni of Clare Hall, Cambridge
King's College London
Academics of the University of Oxford
English biographers
English critics
Fellows of Wolfson College, Oxford